Bergaris jacobsoni is a species of moth of the family Cossidae. It is found on the Southeast Asian islands of Sumatra and  Borneo.

References

Moths described in 1957
Zeuzerinae